The 1991 BYU Cougars football team represented Brigham Young University as a member of the Western Athletic Conference (WAC) during the 1991 NCAA Division I-A football season. Led by 20th-year head coach LaVell Edwards, the Cougars compiled a record of 8–3–2 overall and 7–0–1 in conference play, winning the WAC title for the third consecutive season. BYU was invited to the Holiday Bowl, where the Cougars tied Iowa.

Schedule

Roster

Rankings

Game summaries

Florida State

at UCLA

at Penn State

Iowa (Holiday Bowl)

Awards and honors
 Ty Detmer – Davey O'Brien Award, Consensus First-team All-American, 3rd in Heisman Trophy voting

1992 NFL Draft

References

BYU
BYU Cougars football seasons
Western Athletic Conference football champion seasons
BYU Cougars football